Scott T. Ford was president and chief executive officer of Alltel from 2002 to 2009.

Life
A graduate of the University of Arkansas, Ford worked for Merrill Lynch and Stephens Inc. In 1996 he joined Alltel as executive vice president with responsibility for Alltel's communications businesses and the  corporate staff. He was named president in 1997, assumed the additional duties of chief operating officer in 1998, and was named chief executive officer in 2002. After selling Alltel to Verizon for $28 billion in 2007, Ford joined the advisory council of Rwandan President Paul Kagame.

Alltel was the fifth largest U.S. wireless provider. In 2007, he received an honorary doctorate from The King's College. In 2009, he was named to The King's College's board of trustees.

In June, 2012 Ford joined AT&T's board of directors.

Scott and his father Joe T. Ford formed Westrock Group, which maintains and operates businesses in alternative investment management and coffee, including exporting, trading, roasting, and  hospitality.

References 

American chief executives
University of Arkansas alumni
Living people
American chief operating officers
Year of birth missing (living people)